Hermann Reinhold Fehland (September 21, 1856 – January 14, 1907) was an American politician and businessman.

Born in the province of Brandenburg, Germany, Fehland emigrated with his parents at six months old to the United States and settled in Mayville, Wisconsin. Fehland was involved with the hardware business. He then moved to Merrill, Wisconsin and continued to work in the hardware business: the H. R. Fehland & Company. Fehland was also involved with the National Bank of Merrill. Fehland served on the Merrill Common Council and as mayor of Merrill. He also served as county clerk for Lincoln County, Wisconsin. In 1887, Fehland served in the Wisconsin State Assembly and was a Democrat. Fehland died in Merrill, Wisconsin.

Notes

1856 births
1907 deaths
German emigrants to the United States
Politicians from Brandenburg
People from Mayville, Wisconsin
People from Merrill, Wisconsin
Businesspeople from Wisconsin
County clerks in Wisconsin
Wisconsin city council members
Mayors of places in Wisconsin
19th-century American politicians
19th-century American businesspeople
Democratic Party members of the Wisconsin State Assembly